The section sign, §, is a typographical character for referencing individually numbered sections of a document; it is frequently used when citing sections of a legal code. It is also known as the section symbol, section mark, double-s, or silcrow.

Use 

The section sign is often used when referring to a specific section of a legal code. For example, in Bluebook style, "Title 16 of the United States Code Section 580p" becomes "16 U.S.C. §580(p)". The section sign is frequently used along with the pilcrow (¶), which is sometimes also referred to in English as the "paragraph sign", to reference a specific paragraph within a section of a document. While  is usually read in spoken English as the word section, many other languages use the word "paragraph" exclusively to refer to a section of a document (especially of legal text), and use other words to describe a paragraph in the English sense. Consequently, in those cases "§" may be read as "paragraph", and may occasionally be described as a "paragraph sign", but this is a description of its usage, not a formal name.

It may also be used with footnotes when asterisk , dagger , and double dagger  have already been used on a given page. It is common practice to follow the section sign with a non-breaking space so that the symbol is kept with the section number being cited.

The section sign is itself sometimes a symbol of the justice system, in much the same way as the Rod of Asclepius is used to represent medicine. The Austrian Ministry of Justice used the symbol in its logo for a time.

Keyboard entry 
The sign has the Unicode code point  and many platforms and languages have methods to reproduce it.

Android: 
ChromeOS (with International/Extended keyboard setting)  
Emacs: 
HTML: &sect;, &#167;, &#xA7;
iOS:  (long press)
Linux:  or 
MacOS:  
TeX: \S
URL Encoding: %A7 (Latin1) or %C2%A7 (UTF8)
Vim:  (a Vim digraph)
Windows: +  or + (code page dependent)
 US international setting in Windows:  (with this setting, the right-hand Alt key acts as an AltGr key)

Some keyboards include dedicated ways to access §:
 Brazil: 
 Denmark: 
 France: 
 Germany: 
 Italy: 
 Norway: 
 Portugal: 
 Romania:  (Legacy);  (Standard/Programmers)
 Sweden:  (key left of 1)
 Switzerland:  (key left of 1)
 US Colemak: 
 United Kingdom (Mac):  (key left of 1)

Origin 
Two possible origins are often posited for the section sign: most probably, that it is a ligature formed by the combination of two S glyphs (from the Latin signum sectiōnis). Some scholars, however, are skeptical of this explanation.

Others have theorized that it is an adaptation of the Ancient Greek  (paragraphos), a catch-all term for a class of punctuation marks used by scribes with diverse shapes and intended uses.

The modern form of the sign, with its modern meaning, has been in use since the 13th century.

In literature
In Jaroslav Hašek's The Good Soldier Švejk,  is used repeatedly to mean "bureaucracy". In his English translation of 1930, Paul Selver translated it as "red tape".

See also 
 Scilicet ("it may be known") is sometimes rendered using a § mark instead of "viz."
 Section (typography)

Explanatory footnotes

References

External links
 
 

Punctuation
Typographical symbols